List of the 2004 National Society of Film Critics Awards nominees:

Winners in bold:

Feature films

Best Picture
 Before Sunset
 Million Dollar Baby
 Sideways

Acting

Best Actor
 Clint Eastwood – Million Dollar Baby
 Jamie Foxx – Collateral and Ray
 Paul Giamatti – Sideways

Best Actress
 Julie Delpy – Before Sunset
 Imelda Staunton – Vera Drake (TIE)
 Hilary Swank – Million Dollar Baby (TIE)

Best Supporting Actor
 Thomas Haden Church – Sideways
 Morgan Freeman – Million Dollar Baby
 Peter Sarsgaard – Kinsey

Best Supporting Actress
 Cate Blanchett – The Aviator and Coffee and Cigarettes
 Laura Linney – Kinsey
 Virginia Madsen – Sideways

Directing / Writing

Best Director
 Clint Eastwood – Million Dollar Baby
 Alexander Payne – Sideways
 Yimou Zhang – Shi mian mai fu (also known as House of Flying Daggers)

Best Screenplay
 Alexander Payne and Jim Taylor – Sideways

References
 Critics Are in 'Baby's' Corner Los Angeles Times
 Eastwood Film Captures Critics' Votes Eugene Register-Guard
 Film critics pick gritty 'Baby' as top film in 2004 The San Diego Union-Tribune

National Society Of Film Critics Awards Nominees, 2004